Plantago nivalis is a species of flowering plant in the family Plantaginaceae. It is found in the Sierra Nevada of Spain.

References

nivalis
Taxa named by Pierre Edmond Boissier